The 1948 St. Louis Cardinals season was the team's 67th season in St. Louis, Missouri and the 57th season in the National League. The Cardinals went 85–69 during the season and finished 2nd in the National League.

Regular season 
Outfielder Stan Musial won the MVP Award this year, batting .376, with 39 home runs and 131 RBIs. Musial became the first player to win three National League MVP Awards.

Season standings

Record vs. opponents

Notable transactions 
 April 7, 1948: Dick Sisler was traded by the Cardinals to the Philadelphia Phillies for Ralph LaPointe and $30,000.

Roster

Player stats

Batting

Starters by position 
Note: Pos = Position; G = Games played; AB = At bats; H = Hits; Avg. = Batting average; HR = Home runs; RBI = Runs batted in

Other batters 
Note: G = Games played; AB = At bats; H = Hits; Avg. = Batting average; HR = Home runs; RBI = Runs batted in

Pitching

Starting pitchers 
Note: G = Games pitched; IP = Innings pitched; W = Wins; L = Losses; ERA = Earned run average; SO = Strikeouts

Other pitchers 
Note: G = Games pitched; IP = Innings pitched; W = Wins; L = Losses; ERA = Earned run average; SO = Strikeouts

Relief pitchers 
Note: G = Games pitched; W = Wins; L = Losses; SV = Saves; ERA = Earned run average; SO = Strikeouts

Farm system 

LEAGUE CHAMPIONS: St. Joseph, West Frankfort

References

External links
1948 St. Louis Cardinals at Baseball Reference
1948 St. Louis Cardinals team page at www.baseball-almanac.com

St. Louis Cardinals seasons
Saint Louis Cardinals season
1948 in sports in Missouri